Gowda (also known as Gauda, Goud, Gouda or Gonda) is a caste and surname native to the Karnataka Andhrapradesh and Telangana states of India. It is mainly found among the Vokkaligas, Namadhari Naiks, Billavas in south Karnataka and the Lingayats in north Karnataka and Telugu states of Andhra and Telangana, also in other states with different local names with same historical roots. It is also used by Kurubas.

Gowda was originally an honorific used by the administrative head of a village. Typically, such a head owned land and held political and social sway in the village. Among Kurubas, it was used to refer to the head of the community.

Etymology
According to historian Suryanath U. Kamath, the word Gowda derives from Gavunda. The German Indologist Gustav Oppert opined that the root of ‘Gowda’ is a Dravidian word meaning "mountain".

The term Gowda and its archaic forms in Old Kannada such as Gamunda, Gavunda, Gavuda, Gonda, appear frequently in the inscriptions of Karnataka. The Epigraphia Carnatica is replete with references to land grants, donations to temples, hero-stones (Veeragallu), stone edicts and copper plates dating back to the age of the Western Ganga Dynasty (est. 350 CE) and earlier. The Gavundas were landlords that collected taxes and rendered military service to the Kings. Noboru Karashima says the Gavundas had functions corresponding to that of the Chola Vellala Nattars. While the majority of the gavundas were derived from the Vokkaligas; by the 10th century, the term gavunda also came to denote chiefship of a community or group and was adopted by the heads of other communities assimilated into the early medieval state.

Notable people with surname Gowda 

Notable people with the surname Gowda:

Agriculture 

 M. H. Marigowda, Indian horticulturist

Film 

 Akshara Gowda (born 1991), Indian actress from Karnataka
 Ambareesh (born 1952 as Huche Gowda Amarnath) Indian politician and actor from Karnataka
 Bhavya Gowda (born 1983), Indian model from Karnataka
 Ere Gowda, Indian Kannada film director from Karnataka
 Jaggesh (born 1963 as Eshwar Gowda), Indian Kannada actor from Karnataka 
 K. C. N. Gowda ( 1928–2012), Indian Kannada film producer and film distributor
 Pallavi Gowda (born 1993), Indian actress from Karnataka
 Ravishankar Gowda, Indian actor from Karnataka
 Sheela Gowda (born 1957), Indian artist from Karnataka
 Yash (born Naveen Kumar Gowda), Indian actor from Karnataka

Historical Figures and Rulers 

 Kempe Gowda I (1510–1569), Founder of Bengaluru & feudatory ruler of the Vijayanagara Empire, now Karnataka, India

 Sardar Sarvai Papanna Goud (AKA "Papadu") (1650-1710), Feudatory ruler of Golconda fort and khilashpur fort, in Andhra region, India. First southern ruler waged war against brutality of Mughal army and contemporary of Chatrapati Shivaji.

Law 

 Venkate Gopala Gowda (born 1951), Indian Supreme court judge

Literature 

 H. L. Nage Gowda (1915–2005), Indian Kannada folklorist and author
 Shilpi Somaya Gowda (born 1970), Canadian novelist

Politics 
 D. B. Chandre Gowda (born 1936), Indian politician from Karnataka
 D. V. Sadananda Gowda (born 1953), Indian politician from Karnataka
 H. D. Deve Gowda (born 1933), Indian politician from Karnataka
 Javare Gowda (1915–2016), Indian Kannada author
 K. Chidananda Gowda, Indian computer scientist
 Krishna Byre Gowda (born 1973), Indian politician from Karnataka
 M. J. Appaji Gowda (died 2020), Indian politician
 Maritibbe Gowda, Karnataka politician
 N. H. Gouda, (1938–1992), Indian politician from Karnataka
 Narayana Gowda, Indian politician from Karnataka
 Rajeev Gowda, Indian politician and academic from Karnataka
 Ramachandra Gowda, Indian politician from Karnataka
 Sadananda Gowda, Indian politician from Karnataka
 Shantaveri Gopala Gowda (1923–1972), Indian politician from Karnataka
 Tejashwini Gowda (born 1966), Indian politician from Karnataka
 Tulsi Gowda, Indian environmentalist
 K. Venkatagiri Gowda (born 1923), Indian Economist & politician from Karnataka

Sports 

 Girisha Nagarajegowda (born 1988), Indian Paralympic athlete known as Girish N. Gowda
 Vikas Gowda (born 1983), Indian athlete

See also
 Gouda (disambiguation) 
 Vokkaliga

References

Bibliography 

 

Social groups of Karnataka
Indian surnames